Patrick Mampuya Lema (born 27 May 1985) is a Congolese football defender who plays for FC Saint-Éloi Lupopo.

References 

1985 births
Living people
Democratic Republic of the Congo footballers
Democratic Republic of the Congo international footballers
Association football defenders
AS Vita Club players
FC Saint-Éloi Lupopo players
AS Maniema Union players